Simon van den Bergh (October 26, 1819 in Geffen – April 6, 1907 in Rotterdam) was a Dutch businessperson who founded a margarine factory in the Netherlands in 1872.

In 1888, the same year his son Samuel joined the company, he opened another factory in Kleve, the Van den Bergh Margarine Works. By announcing it was for the industrial manufacture of margarine, he was able to circumvent the high tariffs of the German Reich on butter and margarine. The factory introduced the Sanella brand in 1904, made from almond milk.

In the summer of 1929 (after the death of Simon van den Bergh) the Jurgens & Prince Margarine Works in Goch and Van den Bergh in Kleve merged to become Margarine Unie. The newly merged company then combined with English soap manufacturer Lever Brothers to create the modern company Unilever.

References

1819 births
1907 deaths
19th-century Dutch people
Dutch corporate directors
Dutch chief executives in the manufacturing industry
Dutch Jews
Unilever people
People in food and agriculture occupations
People from Oss
19th-century Dutch businesspeople
20th-century Dutch businesspeople